David de Keyser (22 August 1927 – 20 February 2021) was an English actor and narrator.

Life and career
Born in London in August 1927, in the mid-sixties de Keyser worked twice with the writer, actor and director Jane Arden. Their first collaboration, The Logic Game (January 1965), was directed by Philip Saville. They acted together again in another Jane Arden script in the film Separation (Jack Bond 1968) which was set in London and featured music by Procol Harum, Matthew Fisher and Stanley Myers. The themes of both pieces were marital strife and disintegrating relationships.

De Keyser also worked on four occasions for the British director John Boorman, twice on screen in Catch Us If You Can (1965) and Leo the Last (1970), and on two further occasions Boorman has used de Keyser's rich voice, firstly as the Voice of the Tabernacle in Zardoz (1974), and as the Voice of the Grail in Excalibur (1981). Other unseen roles were the voice of Count Mitterhaus' curse in Vampire Circus (uncredited) and the dubbing of Dracula in The Legend of the 7 Golden Vampires.

He starred in the BBC Radio 4 comedy The Attractive Young Rabbi with Tracy-Ann Oberman. He also made an appearance in the British TV series The Professionals, in the episode entitled "Servant of Two Masters". Other television appearances included the Thriller episode "Someone at the Top of the Stairs", in which he played the eponymous Cartney, Yes Prime Minister in the episode "A Victory for Democracy" where he played the Israeli Ambassador and the Robin of Sherwood episode "The Children of Israel" as Joshua de Talmont. He starred in UK Television series Dick Turpin starring Richard O'Sullivan in part two of an episode entitled "Sentence of Death" where he played the character The Duke of Hesse.

De Keyser was the narrator for Pathe Pictorial in the 1960s, and has also done voiceover work on television advertisements in the United Kingdom, as well as served as the announcer on the first series of comedy panel game Would I Lie to You?, before being replaced for the second series. His voice can also be heard on the trailer (included in DVD releases) for The Dark Crystal. He was married to anti-apartheid activist Ethel de Keyser from 1949 to 1959. He is the father of Alexei de Keyser (1967–2004).

He died in February 2021 at the age of 93.

Partial filmography

1957: The Secret Place – Ticket Clerk (uncredited)
1964: Castle of the Living Dead – Eric (voice, uncredited)
1965: The Logic Game (TV) – The Man
1965: Catch Us If You Can – Zissell
1966: Our Man in Marrakesh – Hotel Clerk and Motorcycle Policeman (uncredited)
1967: King Kong Escapes – Commander Carl Nelson (English version, voice)
1968: Separation – Husband
1968: The Vengeance of She – Killikrates (voice, uncredited)
1969: The Blood of Fu Manchu – of The Governor and others (voice)
1969: The Castle of Fu Manchu – Omar Pasha and others (voice, uncredited)
1969: On Her Majesty's Secret Service – Marc Ange Draco (voice, uncredited)
1970: Leo the Last – David
1970: You Can't Win 'Em All – Gunner Major (voice, uncredited)
1971: Irresistible – Swiss Tourist
1971: The chairman's Wife – Superintendent
1971: The Horsemen – Mukhi (uncredited)
1971: Diamonds Are Forever – Doctor
1972: Vampire Circus – Mitterhaus's Curse (voice, uncredited)
1973: Bequest to the Nation – French Commander (uncredited)
1973: A Touch of Class – Doctor Alvarez
1974: Zardoz – Tarbenacle (voice, uncredited)
1974: The Legend of the 7 Golden Vampires – Dracula (voice, uncredited)
1974: Murder on the Orient Express – Turkish Ticket Collector (voice, uncredited)
1975: Brannigan –Drexel and Jennifer's Boyfriend (uncredited)
1975: Paper Tiger – Ambassador Kagoyama (voice) 
1975: The Hiding Place – Eusie Koonstra
1975: The Romantic Englishwoman – George
1976: The Message – minor roles (uncredited)
1976: Voyage of the Damned – Joseph Joseph
1977: Valentino – Joseph Schenck
1977: Holocaust 2000 – Dubbing (voice, uncredited)
1978: Revenge of the Pink Panther – TV Newscaster (voice, uncredited)
1978: Superman – Warden (voice, uncredited)
1980: Flash Gordon – Colonel of Battle Control Room (voice, uncredited)
1981: Balham, Gateway to the South – Narrator (voice)
1981: Excalibur (voice only)
1982: A Woman Called Golda – David Ben-Gurion
1983: The Ploughman's Lunch – Gold
1983: Yentl – Rabbi Zalman
1984: Lassiter – Gunz (voice)
1985: King David – Ahitophel
1988: Out of the Shadows – James Bluminfeld
1989: A Dry White Season – Susan's Father 
1989: Confessional (TV) – Professor Cherny
1989: Red King, White Knight – Director
1991-92: The House of Eliott – Sir Desmond Gillespie 
1992: Leon the Pig Farmer – Sidney Geller
1993: Poirot – Gaston Beaujeu (The chocolate box)
1997: The Designated Mourner – Howard
1998: Simon Magus – Rabbi
1999: Sunshine – Emmanuel Sonnenschein
2000: The Nine Lives of Tomas Katz – Exhumed rabbi
2002: The Poet – Lomax
2002:  Waking the Dead – Marcus Freeman  in Death Watch (2 episodes)
2003: The Statement – Dom André
2008: God on Trial – Hugo
2008: Good – Mandelstam
2010: Doctor Who  (Voice only) – Atraxi
2010: Gin & Dry (Short Film) – Albie
2014: Closer to the Moon – Moritz

References

External links
 

1927 births
2021 deaths
English male film actors
English male radio actors
English male television actors
English male voice actors